Creation operators and annihilation operators are   mathematical operators that  have widespread applications in quantum mechanics, notably in the study of quantum harmonic oscillators and many-particle systems. An annihilation operator (usually denoted ) lowers the number of particles in a given state by one. A creation operator (usually denoted ) increases the number of particles in a given state by one, and it is the adjoint of the annihilation operator. In many subfields of physics and chemistry, the use of these operators instead of wavefunctions is known as second quantization. They were introduced by Paul Dirac.

Creation and annihilation operators can act on states of various types of particles. For example, in quantum chemistry and many-body theory the creation and annihilation operators often act on electron states.  They can also refer specifically to the ladder operators for the quantum harmonic oscillator. In the latter case, the raising operator is interpreted as a creation operator, adding a quantum of energy to the oscillator system (similarly for the lowering operator). They can be used to represent phonons. Constructing Hamiltonians using these operators has the advantage that the theory automatically satisfies the cluster decomposition theorem.

The mathematics for the creation and annihilation operators for bosons is the same as for the  ladder operators of the quantum harmonic oscillator. For example, the commutator of the creation and annihilation operators that are associated with the same boson state equals one, while all other commutators vanish. However, for fermions the mathematics is different, involving anticommutators instead of commutators.

Ladder operators for the quantum harmonic oscillator

In the context of the quantum harmonic oscillator, one reinterprets the ladder operators as creation and annihilation operators, adding or subtracting fixed quanta of energy to the oscillator system.

Creation/annihilation operators are different for bosons (integer spin) and fermions (half-integer spin). This is because their wavefunctions have different symmetry properties.

First consider the simpler bosonic case of the photons of the quantum harmonic oscillator.
Start with the Schrödinger equation for the one-dimensional time independent quantum harmonic oscillator,

Make a coordinate substitution to nondimensionalize the differential equation

The Schrödinger equation for the oscillator becomes

Note that the quantity    is the same energy as that found for light quanta and that the parenthesis in the Hamiltonian can be written as

The last two terms can be simplified by considering their effect on an arbitrary differentiable function 

which implies,

coinciding with the usual canonical commutation relation ,  in position space representation: .

Therefore,

and the Schrödinger equation for the oscillator becomes, with substitution of the above and rearrangement of the factor of 1/2,

If one defines
 
as the "creation operator" or the "raising operator" and
 
as the "annihilation operator" or the "lowering operator", the Schrödinger equation for the oscillator  reduces to

This is significantly simpler than the original form.  Further simplifications of this equation enable one to derive all the properties listed above thus far.

Letting , where   is the nondimensionalized momentum operator
one has

and

Note that these imply  

The operators  and   may be contrasted to normal operators, which commute with their adjoints.
 
Using the commutation relations given above, the Hamiltonian operator can be expressed as

These relations can be used to easily find all the energy eigenstates of the quantum harmonic oscillator as follows.

Assuming that  is an eigenstate of the Hamiltonian . Using these commutation relations, it follows that

Applying the Hamiltonian to the ground state,

So  is an eigenfunction of the Hamiltonian.

This gives the ground state energy , which allows one to identify the energy eigenvalue of any eigenstate  as

Consequently, 
 

The time-evolution operator is then

Explicit eigenfunctions 
The ground state  of the quantum harmonic oscillator can be found by imposing the condition that

Written out as a differential equation, the wavefunction satisfies

with the solution

Matrix representation 
The matrix expression of the creation and annihilation operators of the quantum harmonic oscillator with respect to the above orthonormal basis is

The eigenvectors  are those of the quantum harmonic oscillator, and are sometimes called the "number basis".

Generalized creation and annihilation operators 

The operators derived above are actually a specific instance of a more generalized notion of creation and annihilation operators. The more abstract form of the operators are constructed as follows. Let  be a one-particle Hilbert space (that is, any Hilbert space, viewed as representing the state of a single particle).

in bra–ket notation.

Thus  embeds as a complex vector subspace of its own CCR algebra.

In general, the CCR algebra is infinite dimensional. If we take a Banach space completion, it becomes a C*-algebra.

The CAR algebra is finite dimensional only if  is finite dimensional. If we take a Banach space completion (only necessary in the infinite dimensional case), it becomes a   algebra. The CAR algebra is closely related to, but not identical to, a Clifford algebra.

Physically speaking,  removes (i.e. annihilates) a particle in the state  whereas  creates a particle in the state .

The free field vacuum state is the state  with no particles, characterized by

If  is normalized so that , then  gives the number of particles in the state .

Creation and annihilation operators for reaction-diffusion equations 

The annihilation and creation operator description has also been useful to analyze classical reaction diffusion equations, such as the situation when a gas of molecules  diffuse and interact on contact, forming an inert product: . To see how this kind of reaction can be described by the annihilation and creation operator formalism, consider  particles at a site  on a one dimensional lattice. Each particle moves to the right or left with a certain probability, and each pair of  particles at the same site annihilates each other with a certain other probability.

All  particles will stay put with a probability . (Since   is so short, the probability that two or more will leave during  is very small and will be ignored.)

We can now describe the occupation of particles on the lattice as a `ket' of the form 

. It represents the juxtaposition (or conjunction, or tensor product) of the number states   ,   located at the individual sites of the lattice. Recall that

and

for all   ≥ 0, while   

This definition of the operators will now be changed to accommodate the "non-quantum" nature of this problem and we shall use the following definition:

note that even though the behavior of the operators on the kets has been modified, these operators still obey the commutation relation 

This allows   writing the pure diffusive behavior of the particles as

where number state n is replaced by number state n − 2 at site  at a certain rate.

Thus the state evolves by 

Other kinds of interactions can be included in a similar manner.

This kind of notation allows the use of quantum field theoretic techniques to be used in the analysis of reaction diffusion systems.

Creation and annihilation operators in quantum field theories

These operators change the eigenvalues of the number operator,
 ,
by one, in analogy to the harmonic oscillator.  The indices (such as ) represent quantum numbers that label the single-particle states of the system; hence, they are not necessarily single numbers.  For example, a tuple of quantum numbers  is used to label states in the hydrogen atom.

The commutation relations of creation and annihilation operators in a multiple-boson system are,
 
 

For fermions, the commutator is replaced by the anticommutator ,
 
 
Therefore, exchanging disjoint (i.e. ) operators in a product of creation or annihilation operators will reverse the sign in fermion systems, but not in boson systems.

If the states labelled by i are an orthonormal basis of a Hilbert space H, then the result of this construction coincides with the CCR algebra and CAR algebra construction in the previous section but one. If they represent "eigenvectors" corresponding to the continuous spectrum of some operator, as for unbound particles in QFT, then the interpretation is more subtle.

Normalization
While Zee obtains the momentum space normalization  via the symmetric convention for Fourier transforms, Tong and Peskin & Schroeder use the common asymmetric convention to obtain .  Each derives .

Srednicki additionally merges the Lorentz-invariant measure into his asymmetric Fourier measure, yielding .

See also
 Fock space
 Segal–Bargmann space
 Optical phase space
 Bogoliubov–Valatin transformation
 Holstein–Primakoff transformation
 Jordan–Wigner transformation
 Jordan–Schwinger transformation
 Klein transformation
 Canonical commutation relations

References

 Albert Messiah, 1966. Quantum Mechanics (Vol. I), English translation from French by G. M. Temmer. North Holland, John Wiley & Sons. Ch. XII.   online

Footnotes

Quantum mechanics
Quantum field theory